The Pokotia Monolith (also known as the Pokotia Monument) is a stone statue excavated from the pre-Incan site of Pokotia in 1960   from Tiwanaku in Bolivia.  In December 2001 inscriptions and patterns on the front and back of the statue were photographed by a team led by the Bolivian archaeologist Bernardo Biados.

It resides in a small museum in Calle Jaén, La Paz, Bolivia; Museo de metales preciosos "Museo de Oro".

References 

1960 archaeological discoveries
Buildings and structures in La Paz Department (Bolivia)
Tiwanaku culture
Monoliths